Bill "Billy" Steele (born 13 November 1952) is a Scottish-Canadian former professional ice hockey player. As a youth, he played in the 1965 Quebec International Pee-Wee Hockey Tournament with a minor ice hockey team from Toronto. During the 1975–76 and 1976–77 seasons, Steele played 84 games in the World Hockey Association with the Cincinnati Stingers.

References

External links

1952 births
Living people
Sportspeople from Edinburgh
Buffalo Norsemen players
Cincinnati Stingers players
Hampton Gulls (AHL) players
Michigan Tech Huskies men's ice hockey players
Tidewater Sharks players
NCAA men's ice hockey national champions